A military reserve force is a military organization whose members have military and civilian occupations. They are not normally kept under arms, and their main role is to be available when their military requires additional manpower. Reserve forces are generally considered part of a permanent standing body of armed forces, and allow a nation to reduce its peacetime military expenditures and maintain a force prepared for war.

In countries with a volunteer military, such as Canada, Spain, the United Kingdom, and the United States, reserve forces are civilians who maintain military skills by training periodically (typically one weekend per month). They may do so as individuals or as members of standing reserve regiments—for example, the UK's Army Reserve. A militia, home guard, state guard or state military may constitute part of a military reserve force, such as the United States National Guard and the Norwegian, Swedish and Danish Home Guard. In some countries (including Colombia, Israel, Norway, Singapore, South Korea, Sweden, and Taiwan), reserve service is compulsory for a number of years after completing national service. In countries with conscription, such as Switzerland and Finland, reserve forces are citizens who have completed active duty military service but have not reached the upper age limit established by law. These citizens are subject to mandatory mobilization in wartime and short-term military training in peacetime.

In countries which combine conscription and a volunteer military, such as Russia, "military reserve force" has two meanings. In a broad sense, a military reserve force is a group of citizens who can be mobilized as part of the armed forces. In a narrow sense, a military reserve force is a group of citizens who have signed contracts to perform military service as reservists, who were appointed to positions in particular military units, and who are involved in all operational, mobilization, and combat activities of these units (active reserve). Other citizens who do not sign a contract (the inactive reserve) can be mobilized and deployed on an involuntary basis.

The deployment of military units composed of reservists generally takes little time and does not require retraining. Mobilization of non-reservists involves the formation of new military units, requiring more time. A military reserve force differs from a reserve formation (sometimes called a military reserve), which is a group of military personnel (or units) not committed to a battle by their commander and available to address unforeseen situations, bolster defences, or perform other tasks.

History

Some countries' 18th-century military systems included practices and institutions which functioned as a reserve force, even if they were not designated as such. For example, the half-pay system in the British Army provided the country with trained, experienced officers not on active duty during peacetime but available during wartime. The Militia Act of 1757 gave Britain an institutional structure for a reserve force. Although contemporaries debated the effectiveness of the British militia, its mobilization in several conflicts increased Britain's strategic options by freeing regular forces for overseas theaters.

Reservists first played a significant role in Europe after the Prussian defeat in the Battle of Jena–Auerstedt. On 9 July 1807, in the Treaties of Tilsit, Napoleon forced Prussia to drastically reduce its military strength and cede large amounts of territory. The Prussian army was limited to a maximum of 42,000 men.

The Krumpersystem, introduced to the Prussian Army by military reformer Gerhard von Scharnhorst, gave recruits a brief period of training which could be expanded during wartime. Prussia could draw upon a large number of trained soldiers in subsequent wars, and the system was retained by the Imperial German Army into the First World War. By the time of the German Empire, reservists were given "war arrangements" after completion of their military service with instructions for the conduct of reservists in wartime.

Sources of reserves

In countries such as the United States, reservists are often former military members who reached the end of their enlistment or resigned their commission. Service in the reserves for a number of years after leaving active service is required in the enlistment contracts and commissioning orders of many nations.

Reservists can also be civilians who undertake basic and specialized training in parallel with regular forces while retaining their civilian roles. They can be deployed independently, or their personnel may make up shortages in regular units. Ireland's Army Reserve is an example of such a reserve.

With universal conscription, most of the male population may be reservists. All men in Finland belong to the reserve until 60 years of age, and 80 percent of each age cohort are drafted and receive at least six months of military training. Ten percent of conscripts are trained as reserve officers. Reservists and reserve officers are occasionally called up for refresher exercises, but receive no monthly salary or position. South Korean males who finish their national service in the armed forces or in the national police are automatically placed on the reserve roster, and are obligated to take several days of annual military training for seven years.

Uses
In wartime, reserves may provide replacements for combat losses or be used to form new units. Reservists can provide garrison duty, manning air defense, internal security and guarding of important points such as supply depots, prisoner of war camps, communications nodes, air and sea bases and other vital areas, freeing regular troops for service on the front.

In peacetime, reservists can be used for internal-security duties and disaster relief, sparing the regular military forces. In many countries where military roles outside warfare are restricted, reservists are exempted from these restrictions.

Personnel

Enlisted personnel

In countries with a volunteer army, reserve enlisted personnel are soldiers, sailors, and airmen who have signed contracts to perform military service on a part-time basis. They have civilian status, except for the days when they are carrying out their military duties (usually two or three days each month and attendance at a two-to-four-week military training camp once per year). Most reserve enlisted personnel are former active duty soldiers, sailors, and airmen, but some join the reserve without an active-duty background. When their contract expires, a reserve soldier, sailor or airman becomes a retired soldier, sailor or airman.

In countries with conscription, reserve enlisted personnel are soldiers, sailors, and airmen who are not on active duty and have not reached the upper age limit established by law. In addition to the upper age limit, intermediate age limits determine the priority of wartime mobilization (younger ages are more subject to mobilization). These limits divide the reserve into categories, such as the Swiss Auszug, Landwehr, and Landsturm. Reserve soldiers, sailors, and airmen are subject to mandatory short-term military training in peacetime, as regulated by law. Reserve soldiers, sailors, and airmen have civilian status, except for military training in peacetime and wartime mobilization. A reserve soldier, sailor or airman becomes a retired soldier, sailor or airman at the upper age limit.

In countries which combine conscription and a volunteer military, reserve soldiers, sailors, and airmen are divided into two categories: reservists and reserve enlisted personnel. Reservists sign a contract to perform military service on a part-time basis. Reserve enlisted personnel are not on active duty, have not signed a contract to perform military service as reservists, and have not reached the upper age limit. Reservists have civilian status, except when they are performing military duties. Reserve enlisted personnel have civilian status, except for military training in peacetime and wartime mobilization. Reservists are first subject to mobilization in wartime. Reserve enlisted soldiers, sailors, and airmen are divided into categories which determine the priority of wartime mobilization (younger personnel are mobilized first), such as Первый разряд (first category), Второй разряд (second category) and Третий разряд (third category) in Russia. A reservist becomes a reserve soldier, sailor or airman when their contract expires, and retires at the upper age limit.

Non-commissioned officers

In countries with a volunteer military, reserve non-commissioned officers are military personnel with relevant rank who have contracted to perform military service on a part-time basis. They have civilian status, except for military duty. Most reserve non-commissioned officers are former active-duty NCOs, but some become reserve NCOs without an active-duty background. When the contract expires, a reserve NCO becomes a retired NCO. The main sources of reserve NCOs are:
 Movement from active-duty to reserve service, preserving NCO rank
 Military schools, which prepare career NCOs who join the reserve after their active-duty service
 Promotion from enlisted rank during reserve service
 Reserve NCO courses

In countries with conscription, reserve NCOs are military personnel with relevant rank who are not on active duty and have not reached the upper age limit. In addition to the upper age limit, intermediate age limits determine the priority of wartime mobilization (younger ages are subject to mobilization first). Reserve NCOs are subject to mandatory short-term military training in peacetime. They have civilian status, except for military training in peacetime and wartime mobilization. A reserve NCO becomes a retired NCO at the upper age limit. Their main sources of NCOs are:
 Promotion from enlisted rank during active-duty service, following demobilization
 Promotion from enlisted rank during short-term military training in peacetime
 Military schools
 Reserve NCO courses

In countries which combine conscription and a volunteer military, reserve NCOs are divided into two categories: non-commissioned officers-reservists and reserve non-commissioned officers. Non-commissioned officers-reservists have signed a contract to perform military service on a part-time basis. Reserve non-commissioned officers are not on active duty, have not signed a contract to perform military service as reservists, and have not reached the upper age limit. Non-commissioned officers-reservists have civilian status, except for the days when they are carrying out their military duties. Reserve non-commissioned officers have civilian status, except for military training in peacetime and wartime mobilization. Non-commissioned officers-reservists are subject to mobilization in wartime first. Reserve non-commissioned officers (non-reservists) are divided into categories which determine the priority of wartime mobilization (younger ages are subject to mobilization first)Первый разряд, Второй разряд, and Третий разряд in Russia. Upon expiration of the contract, a non-commissioned officer-reservist becomes a reserve non-commissioned officer. A reserve NCO becomes a retired NCO at the upper age limit. The main sources of reserve NCOs are:
 Promotion from enlisted rank during active duty service, following demobilization
 Promotion from enlisted rank during short-term military training in peacetime
 Military schools
 Promotion from enlisted rank during reserve service
 Reserve NCO courses

Warrant officers

In countries with a volunteer military, reserve warrant officers are military personnel with relevant rank who have signed a contract to perform military service on a part-time basis. They have civilian status, except for the days when they are carrying out their military duties. Most reserve warrant officers are former active duty warrant officers. The main sources of reserve warrant officers are military schools and reserve warrant-officers courses.

In countries with conscription, reserve warrant officers are military personnel with the relevant rank who are not on active duty and have not reached the upper age limit. In addition to the upper-age limit, intermediate age limits determine wartime mobilization priority; younger officers are mobilized first. The main sources of reserve warrant officers are promotion during active-duty service or short-term peacetime training, assessment after demobilization, military schools, and reserve warrant-officer courses.

Commissioned officers

In countries with a volunteer military, reserve officers are personnel with an officer's commission who have signed a contract to perform part-time military service. They have civilian status, except when carrying out their military duties. Most reserve officers are former active-duty officers, but some become reserve officers after promotion. The main sources of reserve officers are:
 Military schools, colleges and academies, which prepare career officers (who join the reserve after concluding active duty)
 Military educational units in civilian higher-education institutions of higher education, such as the US' Reserve Officers' Training Corps
 Reserve officer's courses
 Direct commission

In countries with conscription, reserve officers are officers who are not on active duty and have not reached the upper age limit. The main sources of reserve officers are:
 Training and assessment at the end of conscript service. About eight percent of Finnish conscripts become reserve officers after one year of service.
 Military educational units in civilian higher-education institutions, such as military departments in Ukraine and military faculties in Belarus
 Military schools, colleges and academies, which prepare career officers (who join the reserve after concluding active duty)
 Reserve-officer courses

In countries with conscription and volunteers, the main sources of reserve officers are:
 Military educational units in civilian higher-education institutions such as Russia's military training centers, which prepare officers (who join the reserve after graduation or after concluding active duty)
 Military schools, colleges and academies, which prepare career officers (who join the reserve after concluding active duty)
 Reserve-officer courses
 Training and assessment at the conclusion of conscript service

Advantages

Military reserves quickly increase available manpower substantially with trained personnel. Reservists are often experienced combat veterans who can increase the quantity and quality of a force. A large reserve pool can allow a government to avoid the costs, political and financial, of new recruits or conscripts. Reservists are usually more economically effective than regular troops, since they are called up as needed. Preparations to institute a call-up (obvious to adversaries) can display determination. Reservists also tend to have training in professions outside the military, and skills attained in a number of professions are useful in the military. In many countries, reserves have capable people who would not otherwise consider a career in the military. They see voluntary training as a hobby, and are inexpensive to train. The skills of reservists have been valuable in peacekeeping because they can be employed for the reconstruction of infrastructure, and tend to have better relations with the civilian population than career soldiers.

Disadvantages
Reservists are usually provided with second-line equipment which is no longer used by the regular army, or is an older version of that in current service. Reservists also have little experience with newer weapons systems. Reservists who are retired service personnel are sometimes considered less motivated than regular troops. Reservists who combine a military and civilian career, such as members of the United Kingdom's Army Reserve, experience time demands not experienced by regular troops which affect their availability and length of service.

Forces by country

Australia
 Royal Australian Naval Reserve
 Australian Army Reserve
 Royal Australian Air Force Reserves

Austria
 Austrian Armed Forces Militia

Brazil
 Brazilian Military Police
 Military Firefighters Corps

Canada
 Primary Reserve
 Canadian Forces Naval Reserve (NAVRES)
 Canadian Army Reserve
 Canadian Forces Air Reserve
 Canadian Forces Health Services Reserve
 Canadian Forces Supplementary Reserve
 Canadian Rangers
 Cadet Organizations Administration and Training Service

People's Republic of China
 Chinese Paramilitary Forces

Colombia
 Army Reserve Professional Corps 
 Navy Reserve Professional Corps 
 Air Force Reserve Professional Corps

Czech Republic
 Active reserves

Denmark
 Royal Danish Air force Reserve
 Army Reserve
 Navy Reserve
 Defence Health Reserve
 Home Guard

Estonia
 Estonian Defence League

Finland
 Territorial Forces

France
 Military reserve forces of France
 National Guard (France)

Greece
 Voluntary Reservist

Indonesia
 Indonesian National Armed Forces Reserve Component

India
 Indian Territorial Army

Ireland
 Reserve Defence Forces
 Army Reserve
 Naval Service Reserve

Israel
 Israel Defense Forces Reserve Service

Italy
 Riserva Selezionata (Army, Navy, Air Force and Carabinieri)

Latvia
 Latvian National Guard

Lithuania
 National Defence Volunteer Forces

Malaysia
 Rejimen Askar Wataniah (Territorial Army Regiment)
 Royal Malaysian Navy Reserve
 Royal Malaysian Air Force Reserve

Singapore
National Servicemen
SAF Volunteer Corps

Netherlands
 National Reserve Corps
 Netherlands Air Force Reserve
 Netherlands Navy Reserve
 Netherlands Marechaussee Reserve

New Zealand
 Royal New Zealand Naval Volunteer Reserve
 New Zealand Army Reserve

Norway
 Norwegian Home Guard

Pakistan
 Civil Armed Forces (nine forces)
 National Guard (two forces)

Philippines
 Armed Forces of the Philippines Reserve Command
 Army Reserve Command, PA
 Air Reserve Command, PAF
 Naval Reserve Command, PN
 Philippine Coast Guard Auxiliary

Russia
 Mobilization Human Reserve

South Africa
 South African National Defence Force Reserve Force Component
 South African Army Reserves
 South African Air Force Reserves
 South African Navy Reserves
 South African Military Health Service Reserves

South Korea
 Republic of Korea Reserve Forces

Former Soviet Union
Reserve Front
Reserve of the Supreme High Command
Reserve armies

Spain
 Voluntary Reservist

Sri Lanka
 Sri Lanka Army Volunteer Force
 Sri Lanka National Guard
 Sri Lanka Volunteer Naval Force
 Sri Lanka Volunteer Air Force

Sweden
 Swedish Home Guard

Switzerland
 Swiss Reserve

Taiwan
 Republic of China Armed Forces Reserve

Thailand
 Student Army Reserve Force

United Kingdom
Volunteer Reserves:
 Royal Naval Reserve (including the University Royal Naval Unit)
 Royal Marines Reserve
 Army Reserve (including the Officers' Training Corps)
 Royal Auxiliary Air Force
 Royal Air Force Volunteer Reserve (incl. University Air Squadron)
Regular Reserves:
 Royal Fleet Reserve
 Army Reserve (Regular)
 Air Force Reserve
Sponsored Reserves:
 Royal Fleet Auxiliary
 Mobile Meteorological Unit

Ukraine
 Territorial Defense Forces

United States

 United States Army Reserve
 United States Air Force Reserve
 United States Marine Corps Reserve
 United States Navy Reserve
 United States Coast Guard Reserve
 National Guard of the United States
 Army National Guard of the United States
 Air National Guard of the United States

Yugoslavia 
 Territorial Defense (TO)

See also
 Military reserve
 National Guard
 State defense force
 Militia

References

Further reading

 Ben-Dor, Gabriel, et al. "I versus We: Collective and Individual Factors of Reserve Service Motivation during War and Peace." Armed Forces & Society, Vol. 34, No. 4
 Ben-Dor, Gabriel, Ami Pedahzur, and Badi Hasisi. "Israel's National Security Doctrine under Strain: The Crisis of the Reserve Army." Armed Forces & Society, Vol. 28, No. 1
 
 
 
 Losky-Feder, Edna, Nir Gazit, and Eyal Ben-Ari. "Reserve Soldiers as Transmigrants: Moving between the Civilian and Military Worlds." Armed Forces & Society, Vol. 34, No. 4
 

Reserve forces